Jeong Bae-yeong (born 15 April 1976) is a South Korean speed skater. She competed in two events at the 1994 Winter Olympics.

References

External links
 

1976 births
Living people
South Korean female speed skaters
South Korean women's ice hockey players
Olympic speed skaters of South Korea
Speed skaters at the 1994 Winter Olympics
Speed skaters at the 1990 Asian Winter Games
Ice hockey players at the 1999 Asian Winter Games
Sportspeople from Gangwon Province, South Korea
20th-century South Korean women